The town and commune of Gandiaye in the Department of Kaolack, central Senegal, lies along National Route 1 about 24 kilometers from Kaolack.  The population (2002) is about 10,000 consisting of the Serer, Wolof, Fula, Bambara and Jola) ethnic groups.

The commune includes the rural towns of Thiomby, le Dya, and Ndiebel.  The economy is mainly agricultural, marketing to highway traffic.  Outsiders come to fish in the Saloum River tributaries.

 the Mayor of Gandiaye was Dr. El Hadji Gueye.  The area is Muslim, Catholic and adherents to Serer religion. The town has a Muslim and a Catholic cemetery.

External links
Official web-page of Gandiaye (via the Internet Archive)

Notes

Populated places in Kaolack Region
Serer country
Kaolack Region
Communes of Senegal